Robert Louden (died 1867), also known by the alias Charlie Dale, was a Confederate saboteur and mail carrier during the American Civil War. He was said to be the primary messenger between General Sterling Price and Confederate regulars and bushwhackers.

As a Confederate agent, Louden was involved in the sabotage and sinking of several Union steamboats near St. Louis, Missouri and, on his deathbed, claimed to have been responsible for the destruction of the steamboat Sultana, which exploded on April 27, 1865 just north of Memphis, Tennessee, killing an estimated 1,300 to 1,900 paroled Union prisoners and civilians returning home after the war, the deadliest maritime disaster in United States history. Louden supposedly confessed to a man named William Streetor to have planted a coal torpedo, an artillery shell disguised to look like an innocuous lump of coal, in a coal pile used to fire the steamboat's boilers.

An article published May 7, 1888 in the New York Times refers to Louden's claim about the Sultana sinking:

The claim is controversial. Most modern scholars support the official explanation that the disaster was purely accidental, pointing out that the explosion occurred in the top rear of the boilers, relatively far from the fireboxes where a coal torpedo would have exploded, which suggests that Louden's story was fabricated.

Louden died of yellow fever in New Orleans, Louisiana in 1867.

References

External links
Civilwarstlouis biography

Year of birth missing
1867 deaths
Deaths from yellow fever
People from St. Louis
People of Missouri in the American Civil War
Infectious disease deaths in Louisiana